Holovkivka is a village in Oleksandriia Raion, Kirovohrad Oblast, Ukraine. The village has a population of 2,217. Holovkivka belongs to Oleksandriia urban hromada, one of the hromadas of Ukraine.

References

Villages in Oleksandriia Raion